Rotraut Richter (15 May 1915 – 1 October 1947) was a German stage and film actress. She appeared in the role of Gerda in the 1933 Nazi propaganda film Hitlerjunge Quex, receiving a letter of thanks from Joseph Goebbels along with the rest of the cast.

Selected filmography
 The First Right of the Child (1932)
 Hitlerjunge Quex (1933)
 The Sporck Battalion (1934)
 Don't Lose Heart, Suzanne! (1935)
 Fruit in the Neighbour's Garden (1935)
 Trouble Backstairs (1935)
 The Violet of Potsdamer Platz (1936)
 Meiseken (1937)
 The Beaver Coat (1937)
 Somewhere in Berlin (1946)
 Wozzeck (1947)

References

Bibliography 
 Kreimeier, Klaus. The Ufa Story: A History of Germany's Greatest Film Company, 1918–1945. University of California Press, 1999.

External links 
 

1915 births
1947 deaths
German film actresses
German stage actresses
Actresses from Berlin
People from the Province of Brandenburg
People from Teltow-Fläming
20th-century German actresses